Nicolas Jean-Baptiste (born March 8, 1989) is a former American football nose tackle. He was signed by the Baltimore Ravens as an undrafted free agent in 2012. He played college football at Baylor.

He also was a member of the Cleveland Browns.

Early years
Jean-Baptiste attended Strake Jesuit College Preparatory. He earned 2006 first-team All-District 17-5A honors on offense as an Offensive guard and defense as a Defensive end.

College career
Jean-Baptiste played at Baylor University. He participated in the 2012 East West Shrine Game. He played 49 games and started 21 games at Nose tackle. He recorded 94 tackles, 5 sacks and a Forced fumble. In 2011 his senior year, Jean-Baptiste recorded a career high 4 sacks along with 36 tackles.

In his junior year, Jean-Baptiste played 12 games and he recorded 31 tackles, half sack. On September 2, 2011, in the season opener against TCU, Jean-Baptiste had four tackles, one tackle was for a loss of gain, a pass deflection and a blocked kick in which Baylor won 50-48 after blowing a 24-point lead. During his junior season, Jean-Baptiste was named the starter in the fourth game of the year against Rice. But Jean-Baptiste had just one tackle as Baylor won 30-13.

In his sophomore year, Jean-Baptiste played 12 games coming off the bench. He had 18 tackles and a half sack. In a game against Northwestern State, he recorded a season high 4 tackles, including one for an assisted loss of gain while Baylor won 68-13.
 
In his redshirt freshman year, Jean-Baptiste played in 12 games and only had 9 tackles. On December 7, 2011, Jean-Baptiste was named to the Second-team All-Big 12.

Professional career

Baltimore Ravens
After going undrafted in the 2012 NFL Draft, Jean-Baptiste signed with the Baltimore Ravens' practice team. On August 31, he was released.

Indianapolis Colts
Jean-Baptiste was signed by the Indianapolis Colts to their practice squad on September 18, 2012. On October 3, 2012, he was released from the practice squad.

Cleveland Browns
He signed with the Cleveland Browns on May 13, 2013. On August 26, he was released.

Arizona Rattlers
Jean-Baptiste was assigned to the Arizona Rattlers of the Arena Football League on December 10, 2013.

Jacksonville Sharks
On March 19, 2015, Jean-Baptiste was traded to the Jacksonville Sharks for Chase Deadder.

References

External links
 Baylor Bears bio
 Baltimore Ravens bio
 Indianapolis Colts bio

1989 births
Living people
Baylor Bears football players
Baltimore Ravens players
Indianapolis Colts players
Arizona Rattlers players
Jacksonville Sharks players